The geography of Greater Manchester is dominated by one of the United Kingdom's largest metropolitan areas, and in this capacity the landlocked metropolitan county constitutes one of the most urbanised and densely populated areas of the country. There is a mix of high density urban areas, suburbs, semi-rural and rural locations in Greater Manchester, but overwhelmingly the land use in the county is urban.

Greater Manchester is a landlocked county spanning  (39th largest in England). The Pennines rise along the eastern side of the county, through parts of the boroughs of Oldham, Rochdale and Tameside. The West Pennine Moors, as well as a number of coalfields (mainly sandstones and shales) lie in the west of the county. The rivers Mersey, Irwell and Tame run through the county boundaries, each of which rise in the Pennines. Other rivers run through the county, including the Beal, the Douglas, the Etherow, the Goyt, the Irk, the Medlock and the Roch. Chat Moss at  comprises the largest area of Grade 1 and 2 farmland in Greater Manchester and contains the largest block of semi-natural woodland in the county. Wardle is the most northerly settlement of Greater Manchester and Ramsden Clough the most northerly point; the suburb of Woodford the most southerly settlement and New Hall Farm (by the River Dean) the most southerly point.

Greater Manchester has a strong regional central business district, formed by Manchester City Centre and the adjoining parts of Salford and Trafford. However, Greater Manchester is also a polycentric county with ten metropolitan districts, each of which has a major town centre – and in some cases more than one  – and many smaller settlements.  Greater Manchester is arguably the most complex urban area in the United Kingdom outside London, and this is reflected in the density of its transport network and the scale of needs for investment to meet the growing and diverse movement demands generated by its development pattern.

Settlements

The following table outlines the county's major settlements, formatted according to metropolitan borough.

Physical and extreme points

County top

Highest point (County Top) – Black Chew Head ( above sea level), at

Extremities

The extreme points of Greater Manchester are:

Northernmost point – Ramsden Clough at 
Northernmost settlement – Wardle at 
Southernmost point – New Hall Farm/River Dean at 
Southernmost settlement – Woodford at 
Westernmost point – Pimbo/Sand Brook at 
Westernmost settlement – Orrell  at 
Easternmost point – Holme Clough Croft (on Saddleworth Moor) at 
Easternmost settlement – Diggle at

Geographic midpoint

Centroid/Geographic midpoint – St Matthew's Church, Crumpsall

Borough tops
The following lists and ranks the highest point of each of Greater Manchester's metropolitan boroughs:

Geology

The underlying geology of Greater Manchester is dominated by rocks from three main periods from the geologic time scale—Carboniferous, Permian-and-Triassic, and Quaternary.

Most of Manchester, and its suburban fringe to the south, is located on Permian sandstones and red Triassic sandstones and mudstones, mantled by thick deposits of till and pockets of sand and gravel deposited by glaciers at the end of the last glacial period, some 15,000 years ago. The oldest rocks, from the Upper Carboniferous period, are sandstones and shales of Millstone Grit present as outcrops and uplands in the north-east of Greater Manchester, such as the upland moors of Dark Peak and South Pennines to the east and northeast of Rochdale, Oldham and Stalybridge. These rocks are overlain by shales, mudstones and thin coals of Coal Measures upon which the towns of Oldham, Rochdale, Bolton and Wigan are located. An outcrop of Coal Measures extends southwards down through Tameside and into Hazel Grove.

Starting in October 2002, a relatively large number of earthquakes were recorded in Greater Manchester, some of which were among notable tremours in the British Isles. By the end of November 2002 more than 100 earthquakes had been recorded by the British Geological Survey. This earthquake swarm was probably caused by the movement of blocks of rocks at depth along faults that occur in the Upper Carboniferous and Triassic succession, underlying the area.

Shallow, primitive, and small-scale coal mining from the Upper Carboniferous Coal Measures in what became Greater Manchester started as early as the 13th century. The situation changed dramatically during and after the Industrial Revolution; the construction of the Bridgewater Canal and other canals in the area, enabled coal to be cheaply transported to Manchester and the River Mersey for shipment. In Oldham, relatively shallow pits were dug due to flooding problems. The writer Daniel Defoe, on a visit to Oldham, described it as a place of "... Coals ... upon the top of the highest hills" because the coal seams were so shallow and accessibile. Advances in mining technology during the late-19th century lead to the formation of deeper mines. The Long Depression aside, there was a rapid acceleration of coal mining until about 1920, when the collieries in the eastern part of the Manchester Coalfield were exhausted and closed. In the western part of the coalfield, however, coal mining was continued into the 1960s. Coal mining ceased in north Manchester in the late 1970s.

Fringe and boundary
To the northwest are the West Pennine Moors, and to the north and northeast the South Pennines. Parts of the Peak District National Park also cover the east and south east of Greater Manchester.

Urban Area

The Greater Manchester Urban Area is the larger of two main conurbations defined by the Office for National Statistics that lie within the county boundaries, the other being the Wigan Urban Area.

The Greater Manchester Urban Area is an area of land defined by the Office for National Statistics consisting of the large conurbation surrounding and including the City of Manchester. Its territory spans much, but not all of the metropolitan county of Greater Manchester. It excludes settlements such as Wigan, Westhoughton, and Marple from the Greater Manchester county boundaries (Wigan itself forming the Wigan Urban Area), but includes some settlements which are outside of the county boundaries, such as Wilmslow and Alderley Edge in Cheshire, and Whitworth in Lancashire.

Climate
Greater Manchester experiences a temperate maritime climate, like most of the British Isles, with relatively cool summers and mild winters. The mean temperature is slightly above average for the United Kingdom; Greater Manchester also has a relatively high humidity level, which lent itself to the optimised and breakage-free textile manufacturing which took place around the county. Snowfall is not a common sight in the built up areas, due to the urban warming effect. However, the Pennine and Rossendale Forest hills around the eastern and northern edges of the county receive more snow, and roads leading out of the county can be closed due to heavy snowfall, notably the A62 road via Standedge, the A57 (Snake Pass) towards Sheffield, and the M62 over Saddleworth Moor.

Flora and fauna

Contrary to its reputation as an urban sprawl, Greater Manchester has green belt, constraining urban drift, and a "wide and varied range" of wildlife and natural habitat. For instance, the wooded valleys of Bolton, Bury and Stockport, the moorlands north and east of Rochdale, Oldham and Stalybridge, and the reed beds between Wigan and Leigh, harbour flora and fauna of national importance. Mature woodland, scrubland, grassland, high moorland, mossland, agricultural land, lakes, wetlands, river valleys, embankments, urban parks and suburban gardens are habitats found in Greater Manchester which further contribute to biodiversity. The Greater Manchester Ecology Unit classifies Sites of Biological Importance. Among the SSSIs are Astley and Bedford Mosses which form a network of ancient peat bog on the fringe of Chat Moss, which in turn, at  comprises the largest area of prime farmland in Greater Manchester and contains the largest block of semi-natural woodland in the county. The Wigan Flashes, such as those at Pennington Flash Country Park, are the by-product of coal mining, where subsidence has led to waterbodies collecting in the resulting hollows which form an important reed bed resource in Greater Manchester. Opened in 1979, Sale Water Park is a  area of countryside and parkland in Sale which includes a  artificial lake by the River Mersey.

Clover, sorrel, nettle and thistle are common, and grow wild in Greater Manchester. Common heather (Calluna vulgaris) dominates the uplands, such as Saddleworth Moor, which lies within the South Pennines and Dark Peak area of the Peak District National Park. The Rochdale Canal harbours Floating Water-plantain (Luronium), an endangered aquatic plant. In 2002, Plantlife International launched its County Flowers campaign, asking members of the public to nominate and vote for a wild flower emblem for their county. Common cottongrass (Eriophorum angustifolium), a plant with fluffy white plumes native to wet hollows on high moors, was announced as the county flower of Greater Manchester.

The grey squirrel was the most common wild mammal seen in Greater Manchester in 2012, and were reported in four out of five gardens; hedgehogs were seen in nearly half of all gardens surveyed; bats were seen in a third of all gardens surveyed. The house sparrow, common starling, and common blackbird are among the most populous bird species in Greater Manchester; almost a third of Greater Manchester's gardens had baby blackbirds in June 2012. Eurasian magpie and feral pigeon are common and breed in habitats across the county. The South Pennines support internationally important numbers of European golden plover, curlew, merlin and twite.

References

Notes

Bibliography